Helen Moulder (born 1947) is a New Zealand actress.

Biography
Helen Moulder was born in Brightwater, Nelson, New Zealand  in 1947. However she began her professional career in the UK in 1974, singing in musicals and pantomime and spending a year with the D'Oyly Carte Opera Company. In 1977 she returned to New Zealand where she has worked for several decades as an actor in theatre, television, film, and radio.  In 2000 she won Actress of the Year in the Chapman Tripp Theatre Awards for her role as Vivian Bearing in the Circa Theatre production of Wit and did the same in 2003 for Sylvia in Meeting Karpovsky, a play she produced with Sir Jon Trimmer.

Theatre
Recent theatre roles she has undertaken in New Zealand include the comic character of Cynthia Fortitude, which she developed along with Rose Beauchamp, who plays her long-suffering sidekick and accompanist Gertrude Rallentando, as part of their contributions to Hen's Teeth performances over several decades. Feature-length performances involving these characters include A Vote for Cynthia and The Legend Returns; the latter was developed from a Hen's Teeth sketch in 1997 and toured in New Zealand and San Francisco. She has also played Madam Giry in Ken Hill's Phantom of the Opera in Japan, and Virginia Woolf in Vita and Virginia.

She is represented by GCM (Gail Cowan Management Ltd).

Filmography

References

External links

 Willow Productions
Helen Moulder 

1947 births
New Zealand actresses
Living people
People from Brightwater